The occipital branches of occipital artery are terminal branches of the occipital artery which supply the back of the head.

Arteries of the head and neck